Sisyrinchium campestre, the prairie blue-eyed grass or white-eyed grass, is a small herbaceous perennial plant in the iris family, native to prairie and meadow in the central United States and in extreme southern Manitoba.

Prairie blue-eyed grass is one of the more drought tolerant species in the genus. It blooms in late spring and early summer for about three weeks. The flowers are white to pale blue, with yellow centers. The flowers are borne on slender pedicels (stems) in an umbel enclosed in two bracts at the top of an unbranched flat stem. The root system is coarse and fibrous. A plant produces offsets and forms a dense clump over time.

References

Taxa named by Eugene P. Bicknell
Flora of the North-Central United States
campestre
Flora without expected TNC conservation status